Vlădeni is a commune in Dâmbovița County, Muntenia, Romania. It is composed of a single village, Vlădeni, part of Dărmănești Commune until 2003, when it was split off.

References

Communes in Dâmbovița County
Localities in Muntenia